$1.99 Romances is an album by God Street Wine. It was their first release on a major record label and their only release with Geffen.

Disappointed about the promotion of this record, GSW negotiated to be dropped from the label after the album came out. They then recorded their next album, Red, on their own, before being signed to Mercury Records.

Critical reception
UPI called the album "strong", writing that producer Jim Dickinson "worked his magic". The Washington Post wrote that $1.99 Romances "separates the group from the jam-band pack by using Steely Dan as its main model rather than the usual choices of the Grateful Dead or the Allman Brothers." Trouser Press wrote that the band "is like a top-drawer wedding band taking the liberty of showcasing some songs of its own devising while the chopped liver is being served". 

Billboard praised Dickson's production work, writing that the album "captures the group's Steely Dan-like musical cool and sophistication." Steve Blush, in New York Rock: From the Rise of The Velvet Underground to the Fall of CBGB, called it "a dollar-bin classic".

Track listing

Personnel
Jon Bevo – Organ, Piano, Vocals
Lo Faber – Guitar, Vocals, Mixing
Aaron Maxwell – Guitar, Vocals
Dan Pifer – Bass, Guitar (Bass), Vocals
Tomo – Drums, Vocals, Trap Kit

Production
Chris Curran – Engineer, Mixing Assistant
Jim Dickinson – Producer
Nick DiDia – Mixing
Sanchez Harley – Vocal Coach
Bob Krusen – Engineer
Michael Lavine – Photography
George Marino – Mastering
Kevin Reagan – Art Direction, Design
Joe Rogers – Engineer
Malcolm Springer – Engineer

References

1994 albums
God Street Wine albums
Albums produced by Jim Dickinson
Geffen Records albums